Portokalli (translation: Orange) is an Albanian weekly night sketch comedy and variety show filmed in Tirana to be specific in Kashar in front of a live audience. The format of the show includes stand-up comedy, sketch comedy, and live music making the show similar to the "NBC" show "Saturday Night Live".  Portokalli is known to make fun of everyday problems through humor and satire. It also makes fun of political figures such as Sali Berisha, Edi Rama, Hashim Thaçi, Ramush Haradinaj, Lulzim Basha,Ilir Meta,Jozefina Topalli and other world leaders like Emmanuel Macron,Vladimir Putin,Alexander Vucic,Donald Trump,Kim Jong Un,Angela Merkel and their relations with Albania.  Portokalli reaches an audience of many ages and is aired on Top Channel.

Cast
Florjan Binaj
Gazmend Paja
Erand Sojli
Ledio Lako
Salsano Rrapi
Rezart Veleshnja
Albana Perhati
Marin Orhanasi
Gent Bejko
Elvis Pupa
Romir Zalla
Gentian Zenelaj
Julian Deda
Ervina Kotolloshi
Irgen Çela
Erion Isai
Gent Hazizi
Ervin Bejleri
Xheni Hallulli
Renada Caci
Erdit Asllanaj
Suela Xhonuzi
Eneda Tarifa
Xhemi Shehu
Roland Saro
Bes Bitraku
Jorke Broka
Ilia Kaci
Kreshnik Ibrahimi
Arben Dervishi
Linda Jarani
Rudina Dembacaj
Erblin Bajko
Ergys Cekrezi
Olsi Bylyku
Aleksandër Grami
Delinda Zhupa
Genci Fuga
Gladiola Harizaj

Viewers
Portokalli attracts over 1 million viewers in Albania, Kosovo, North Macedonia and Diaspora.

Parts of Portokalli

Një det me info (A sea of info)
Portokill
The SHBLSH
RTV Kashari 
Loja për pushtet (Game of thrones parody)
Kimikati (the Chemical)
Bukra dhe sekretarja e saj (Bukra and her secretary)
Dy Policat (The Two Policemen) [Formerly known as: Polici (The Policemen) / 2006-2015]
Çifti i lumtur (Happy couple)
TV Truthi (Truthi TV)
Danoci sh.p.k
Muli Event
Atentatet (Assassinations)
InstaGirls (the Instagram Girls)
Bab e bir (Father and Son)
Burgu Privat (the Private Prison)
Pasdite dhe Portokalle (Afternoons and Oranges)
 Familja Astari (Astari Family)
 Luzja
 Ramadan Kafsha 
 Bela dhe Stela (Bela and Stela)
 Piceri Django (Django Pizzeria)
 Nini dhe Vini (Nini and Vini)
 Mami dhe Vajza (Mother and Daughter)
 Zona e Brrylit (Brryli Zone)

Notes and references
Notes:

References:

Albanian television shows
Mass media in Tirana
Top Channel original programming

sq:Portokalli